Marko Ždero (born 14 March 1985) is a Serbian former professional basketball player.

3x3 basketball career 
Ždero started to play at the FIBA 3x3 World Tour in August 2012 with his childhood friends and current teammates Dušan Domović Bulut and Marko Savić. He plays for United Arab Emirates based team Novi Sad Al-Wahda.

Serbia national team 
Ždero represents Serbia in the 3x3 basketball. He won three gold medals at the FIBA 3x3 World Championships (2012 in Greece, 2016 in China and 2017 in France) and silver medal at the 2014 tournament in Russia.

Basketball career 
Ždero plays for the Srbobran based team Akademik in the North Division of the Serbian First League (3rd tier).

Awards and accomplishments 
 FIBA 3x3 World Tour winner: 3 (2014, 2015, 2018)

References

External links
 

1985 births
Living people
People from Bačka Palanka
Serbian men's basketball players
Serbian men's 3x3 basketball players
Basketball players at the 2015 European Games
European Games medalists in basketball
FIBA 3x3 World Tour players
Basketball players at the 2019 European Games
European Games bronze medalists for Serbia
European champions for Serbia